51 Aurigae is a single star in the northern constellation of Auriga. It is visible to the naked eye as a dim, orange-hued star with an apparent visual magnitude of about 5.70. It is receding from the Earth with a heliocentric radial velocity of 32 km/s.

At 2.2 billion years old, 51 Aurigae has evolved off from the main sequence and is now a K-type giant star. It is 1.58 times as massive as the Sun, 24.5 times as wide, and 178 times as luminous. It emits radiation from its photosphere with an effective temperature of about 4,277 K.

References

K-type giants
Auriga (constellation)
Aurigae, 51
Durchmusterung objects
047070
031771
2419